was a Japanese football player. He played for Japan national team.

Club career
Takamoro was born in Saitama on November 9, 1907. He played for Saitama Shukyu-Dan and Waseda WMW was consisted of his alma mater Waseda University players and graduates. At the club, he played with many Japan national team players Shigeyoshi Suzuki, Haruo Arima, Misao Tamai, Tamotsu Asakura, Shigeru Takahashi, Shojiro Sugimura, Nagayasu Honda and Michiyo Taki. He won 1928 Emperor's Cup.

National team career
In August 1927, when Takamoro was a Waseda University Senior High School student, he was selected Japan national team for 1927 Far Eastern Championship Games in Shanghai. At this competition, on August 27, he debuted against Republic of China. On August 29, he also played against Philippines and Japan won this match. This is Japan national team first victory in International A Match. He played 2 games for Japan in 1927.

After retirement
After retirement, Takamoro worked at Asahi Shimbun from 1936 to 1962.

Takamoro died on March 26, 1995 at the age of 87.

National team statistics

References

External links
 
 Japan National Football Team Database

1907 births
1995 deaths
Waseda University alumni
Association football people from Saitama Prefecture
Japanese footballers
Japan international footballers
Association football defenders